Tandahimba is one of the six districts of the Mtwara Region of Tanzania. It is bordered to the east by the Mtwara Rural District, to the south by Mozambique, to the west by the Newala District, and to the north by the Lindi Region.

According to the 2002 Tanzania National Census, the population of the Tandahi
mba District was 204,648.

Wards
The Tandahimba District is administratively divided into 22 wards:

 Chaume
 Chigungwe
 Kishumundu
 Kitama
 Luagala
 Lukokoda
 Lyenje
 Mahuta
 Maundo
 Michenjele
 Mihambwe
 Milongodi
 Mdimba Mnyoma
 Mkonjowano
 Mkoreha
 Mkwiti
 Mnyawa
 Namikupa
 Nanhyanga
 Naputa
 Ngunja
 Tandahimba

References

Districts of Mtwara Region